Elections to Preston City Council took place on 1 May 2008.

Preston council is elected "in thirds" which means one councillor from each three-member ward, and councillors from selected two-member wards, are elected each year, with one year free from all elections to ensure all councillors serve a full term.

Due to the "in thirds" system, these election results are compared to the 2004 Preston Council election.

Summary
In this summary, "seats" represent the number of wards each party are defending. In two cases this year, the winning candidate in 2004 has since defected to another party, but for comparison the defending party is that from 2004.

In this summary box, The Left List are a party split from RESPECT - The Unity Coalition.

Ashton
Won in corresponding 2004 elections by Conservative Party, majority 51

Brookfield
Won in corresponding 2004 elections by Labour Party, majority 265

Cadley
Won in corresponding 2004 elections by Liberal Democrats, majority 329

Deepdale
Won in corresponding 2004 elections by independent, majority 221

Fishwick
Won in corresponding 2004 elections by Conservative Party, majority 41. The winning candidate subsequently defected to the Liberal Democrats (and switched back to the Conservatives after losing the 2008 election). The result in 2008 will be based on the Conservative "defence", as is normal practice when comparing election results.

Garrison
Won in corresponding 2004 elections by Conservative Party, majority 650

Greyfrairs
Won in corresponding 2004 elections by Conservative Party, majority 1,142

Ingol
Won in corresponding 2004 elections by Liberal Democrats, majority 380. The winning candidate subsequently defected to the Conservative Party. The result in 2008 will be based on the Liberal Democrat "defence", as is normal practice when comparing election results.

Larches
Won in corresponding 2004 elections by Liberal Democrats, majority 137

Lea
Won in corresponding 2004 elections by Liberal Democrats, majority 409

Rural East
Won in corresponding 2004 elections by Conservative Party, majority 828

Rural North
Won in corresponding 2004 elections by Conservative Party, majority 1,711

Ribbleton
Won in corresponding 2004 elections by Labour Party, majority 631

Riversway
Won in corresponding 2004 elections by Labour Party, majority 185

Sharoe Green
Won in corresponding 2004 elections by Conservative Party, majority 639

St George's
Won in corresponding 2004 elections by Labour Party, majority 185

St Matthew's
Won in corresponding 2004 elections by Labour Party, majority 199

Town Centre
Won in corresponding 2004 elections by Labour Party, majority 142

Tulketh
Won in corresponding 2004 elections by Labour Party, majority 49

Held by Labour in 2008 by-election, majority over Liberal Democrats of 23.

References
Preston City Council

2008 English local elections
2008
2000s in Lancashire